Blackout in New York may refer to:
 Northeast blackout of 1965
 New York City blackout of 1977
 Northeast blackout of 2003
Manhattan blackout of July 2019